The Rivers State Ministry of Agriculture is a ministry of the Government of Rivers State charged with regulation and formulation of policies related to the agricultural sector of the state with aim to secure food, improve the economy of the rural areas and protect the environment. Rivers State is one of the county's leading agricultural-producing states. The ministry is located at 6th Floor, State Secretariat, Port Harcourt.

Departments
Fisheries
Forestry
Veterinary and Livestock

Parastatals
Agricultural Development Programme (ADP)
Rivers State Agricultural Marketing Company (RIVAMACO)
Rivers State School-To-Land Authority
Delta Rubber Company
RISONPALM

List of commissioners
1999: Tele Ikuru
2004: Ndubuisi Adikema
2007: Chidi Nweke
2008: Marshall Stanley Uwom
2009: Emmanuel Chinda
2015: Onimim Jacks

See also
Government of Rivers State
Government ministries of Rivers State

References

External links
Official website

Agriculture
Rivers State
Ministry of Agriculture